Joseph Leroy Heath, Jr. "JoJo" (March 9, 1957 – December 30, 2002) was an American football defensive back who played three years in the National Football League (NFL), three years in the Canadian Football League (CFL), and one year in the United States Football League (USFL).

Early life 
The son of Joseph Leroy Heath, Sr. and Fannie Grogan Heath, JoJo grew up in Monessen, PA, a small city in Western Pennsylvania.

High school career 
A star athlete for the Monessen Greyhounds, he was a three-year starter in football and basketball.  He also excelled in track and field.   JoJo was also skilled in martial art and held a Black Belt in Karate.

Recruiting 
College career
Highly sought-after by several Division I college football teams, JoJo was recruited by the Pittsburgh and played for Pitt from 1976 to 1979.

Professional career
In 1980, Heath was selected by the Cincinnati Bengals in the sixth round of the NFL Draft.

Death 
He was stabbed to death on December 30, 2002, in Charleroi, Pennsylvania at age 45.

References

1957 births
2002 deaths
American football defensive backs
Canadian football defensive backs
Pittsburgh Panthers football players
Cincinnati Bengals players
Philadelphia Eagles players
Toronto Argonauts players
BC Lions players
Houston Gamblers players
Ottawa Rough Riders players
New York Jets players
National Football League replacement players
People murdered in Pennsylvania
American murder victims
Deaths by stabbing in Pennsylvania